Mary Street is a predominantly retail street in Dublin, Ireland on the northside of the city contiguous with Henry Street.

It is not to be confused with the nearby Little Mary Street which runs parallel on the West side of Capel Street.

Location 
Mary Street runs from Capel Street in the east to the junction of Henry Street and Liffey Street Upper in the east. It is crossed by Upper Jervis Lane, Wolfe Tone Street, and Jervis Street.

History 
The name is derived from the area being part of the historical lands which made up St. Mary's Abbey from 1139. The Abbey was dissolved in the 1530s and later the street became part of the parish of St Mary from 1697. It is likely that Mary Street was laid out by Jervis in the mid 1690s.

The street is part of a larger general area developed by Humphrey Jervis after 1674 and is located in what was then one of the richest parishes in the city.

Notable buildings and businesses 
Various important institutions and buildings have been located on the street or on the location of what was later to become the street.

Langford House
Langford House was one of the earliest and the grandest structures in the area which later made up the street and was later named for Hercules Langford Rowley when it was acquired in 1743. It was described as a four-storey over basement, five-bay townhouse and was said to be originally almost Jacobean in style. In 1697, Paul Barry, Keeper of the Pipe, took a lease of the site with a frontage of 170 feet and depth of 210 feet and erected the house in the years following before being sold on again in 1712. It is likely that the construction of Langford House and St Mary's Church were being undertaken at the same time.

In 1765, Robert Adam redesigned the interior of the house giving it more of a Georgian appearance with extensive ceiling and wall stucco work across the main entertaining rooms. The much altered Georgian style house which was set back from the rest of main building line of the street. The house was finally demolished in 1931, and replaced with nurses school for Jervis Street hospital and later with commercial and retail buildings which now form part of the facade of the Jervis Shopping Centre.

Todd Burns department store

The former Todd Burns department store is one of the most prominent buildings on the street. It was designed by W. Mitchell and was built in 1905. It is now the location of the flagship store and head office of the retail chain Penney's (Primark) having been acquired out of bankruptcy by Galen Weston in 1969.

Apothecaries' Hall of Ireland
In 1791, Apothecaries' Hall was erected at 40 Mary Street, at a cost of £6,000. The hall was described as a plain building and contained a spacious chemical laboratory where medicines were prepared. Lectures were delivered at the hall, and part of it was also a wholesale warehouse, where the apothecaries could procure their materials.

Volta Electric Theatre 

Number 45 Mary Street was the location of the first cinema in Dublin, the Volta Electric Cinema, which opened in 1909 and was managed by James Joyce.

St Mary's Church 
St Mary's Church is a former Church of Ireland building which now operates as a pub and restaurant. The churchyard and adjacent graveyard now form what is called Wolfe Tone Square.

See also
 Jervis Street
 Henry Street, Dublin
 Capel Street
 Wolfe Tone Square

References

External links 

 Mary Street listings in the Thom's Directory 1862
 Old photo of Mary Street from the UCD digital library (1922)

Streets in Dublin (city)